Jessie Barr (born 24 July 1989 in Waterford, Ireland) is an Irish athlete who competed at the 2012 Summer Olympics.

Early life
Jessie is from Dunmore East in Waterford and she attended the local girls primary school, the Light of Christ National School. She also attended the Ursuline Convent (St Angela's School), Waterford. Her parents are Thomas and Martina Barr. She has a sister Becky and she is the older sister of hurdler Thomas Barr.

Career
She currently lives in Limerick. She competed for Ireland in the London Olympics. In the 400 metres hurdles she has also been a European Athletics Championship Finalist, a World University Games Finalist and she is the Irish U23 Record holder.

She was forced to lay off her training in 2014 following a stress fracture to her foot so she finished her Masters in Sports Psychology at the University of the West of England. She moved back to her training group in Limerick, Ireland in September 2014 and started her PhD in Sport Psychology.

References

External links
IAAF Profile

1989 births
Living people
Olympic athletes of Ireland
Athletes (track and field) at the 2012 Summer Olympics
Athletes from the Republic of Ireland
People from Waterford (city)
Irish female sprinters
Olympic female sprinters